At Ruedesheimer Castle There Is a Lime Tree is a 1928 German silent film directed by Johannes Guter and starring Werner Fuetterer, Marija Leiko and Alvin Neuss. It was made by the German subsidiary of the American Fox Film company. It takes its title from a popular German song of the same name.

Cast

References

Bibliography

External links

1928 films
Films of the Weimar Republic
German silent feature films
Films directed by Johannes Guter
German black-and-white films